Zeidora milerai is a species of sea snail, a marine gastropod mollusk in the family Fissurellidae, the keyhole limpets.

Description

Distribution
This species occurs in the Caribbean Sea along Cuba.

References

 Espinosa, Ortea & Fernandez-Garces (2005 ["2004"]) Avicennia 17 : 67–70
 Bouchet, P.; Fontaine, B. (2009). List of new marine species described between 2002-2006. Census of Marine Life.

External links

Fissurellidae
Gastropods described in 2004